Postol may refer to:
Pella (modern), Postol in Slavic languages
Theodore Postol (1946 - ), scientist
Viktor Postol (1984 - ), Boxer